Tahira Aurangzeb  is a Pakistani politician who has been a member of the National Assembly of Pakistan, since August 2018. Previously she was a member of the National Assembly from March 2008 to May 2018.

She is mother of Maryam Aurangzeb.

Political career
She was elected to the National Assembly of Pakistan as a candidate of Pakistan Muslim League (N) (PML-N) on a seat reserved for women from Punjab in the 2008 Pakistani general election. The 2007-2008 report of Transparency International revealed she has declared assets of over 17 million PKR. She actively promoted her relatives on prominent posts in government including her sister Najma Hameed and her daughter Maryam Aurangzeb to reserved seats for women.

She was re elected to the National Assembly as a candidate of PML-N on a reserved seat for women from Punjab in 2013 Pakistani general election and 2018 Pakistani general election.

References

Living people
Pakistan Muslim League (N) MNAs
Punjabi people
Pakistani MNAs 2013–2018
Pakistani MNAs 2008–2013
Women members of the National Assembly of Pakistan
Year of birth missing (living people)
Pakistani MNAs 2018–2023
21st-century Pakistani women politicians